The following is a list of notable events and releases of the year 1924 in Norwegian music.

Events

 Kringkastningselskapet A/S was founded. This was the predecessor to the Norwegian Broadcasting Corporation, established in 1933.

Deaths

 April
 12 – Sjur Helgeland, hardingfele fiddler and composer (born 1858).

Births

 June
 6 – Gunnar Brunvoll, impresario and opera administrator (died 1999).

 August
 23 – Edvard Fliflet Bræin, composer and conductor (died 1976).

 October
 18 – Egil Hovland, composer (died 2013).

See also
 1924 in Norway
 Music of Norway

References

 
Norwegian music
Norwegian
Music
1920s in Norwegian music